The 2022 United Arab Emirates Tri-Nation Series was the 10th round of the 2019–2023 ICC Cricket World Cup League 2 cricket tournament that took place in the United Arab Emirates in March 2022. Originally scheduled to take place in February 2023, it was moved back to March 2022 due to fixtures impacted by the COVID-19 pandemic being rearranged.

It was a tri-nation series between Nepal, Papua New Guinea and the United Arab Emirates cricket teams, with the matches played as One Day International (ODI) fixtures. The ICC Cricket World Cup League 2 formed part of the qualification pathway to the 2023 Cricket World Cup.

In the week before the series, the UAE competed in another tri-nation series, winning two of their four games. In preparation for the series, Nepal played four warm-up matches in Sri Lanka, winning twice against Sri Lanka Navy Club and once against Sri Lanka Police, before losing to a Sri Lanka Combined XI.

On 19 March 2022, Papua New Guinea registered their first win in their 15th match of the Cricket World Cup League 2, when they beat the United Arab Emirates by six wickets.

Squads

On 28 February 2022, Nepal named a preliminary squad of 20 players for the tournament. On 3 March 2022, the squad was cut to 16 players as the team travelled to Sri Lanka for a series of warm-up matches before travelling on to the UAE. Mohammad Boota, Karthik Meiyappan and Rahul Bhatia were all named as reserves in the UAE squad.

Fixtures

1st ODI

2nd ODI

3rd ODI

4th ODI

5th ODI

6th ODI

References

External links
 Series home at ESPN Cricinfo

2022 in Emirati cricket
2022 in Papua New Guinean cricket
2022 in Nepalese cricket
International cricket competitions in 2021–22
United Arab Emirates
March 2022 sports events in the United Arab Emirates